Lee Sang-heon (born 26 February 1998) is a South Korean football midfielder who plays for Busan IPark in the K League 2.

References

External links 
 

1998 births
Living people
Association football midfielders
South Korean footballers
Ulsan Hyundai FC players
Jeonnam Dragons players
K League 1 players
Sportspeople from North Gyeongsang Province